Malév Flight 110 was a scheduled flight from Budapest-Ferihegy Airport to Borispol Airport. On 16 September 1971, the Tupolev Tu-134 (HA-LBD) crashed near Kiev-Borispol Airport, Ukraine, due to poor visibility conditions, killing all 49 passengers and crew on board. The crash of Flight 110 was Ukraine's third worst airplane crash at the time, and is now the 10th worst for the country.

Accident
The flight from Budapest, Hungary had been delayed by more than an hour due to poor weather conditions. The flight eventually took off and reached its destination at Kiev-Borispol Airport in Ukraine; however, the weather conditions had created heavy fog leading to visibility of only . These conditions made the crew unable to land on their first attempt. It would have been advised that the plane either return to land at Budapest or another nearby airport, but the pilot chose to keep circling and try to land at Kiev-Borispol Airport. The airplane also signaled that the plane's generator had failed and had forced the crew to switch to the battery's auxiliary power,however, subsequent investigation found that this was a false signal which could have been rectified but it was not. The crew did inform ground control of this situation but they did not report that it was an emergency according to protocol. In the event of such an emergency, it was recommended for crew to shut down excessive energy consumers like refrigerators, kitchen heaters or cabin lighting in order to allow the airplane to operate on battery power for longer, but this did not occur on Flight 110, so the battery life decreased by half. The plane deviated significantly from the advised flight-path and flew over the airport, losing integral radio and radar connection with ground-control. Battery power would have been significantly depleted, likely causing instrument malfunctions and leaving the crew unaware of critical information for a safe landing in the weather conditions. It was impossible to identify the victims from the wreckage, however none of the 8 crew members and 41 passengers on board survived. After an investigation, officials determined that the crash was caused by a series of events involving pilot error, mismanagement of the situation by the ground crew, aircraft malfunctions, and poor conditions.

References

Sources 
 https://aviation-safety.net/database/record.php?id=19710916-2
http://iho.hu/hir/a-kijevi-katasztrofa-titkai
http://www.bacs-kiskun-leveltar.hu/V3/SP07_mbn/Tanulmanyok/szbe-02t-1.html 

Aviation accidents and incidents in 1971
Aviation accidents and incidents in the Soviet Union
Accidents and incidents involving the Tupolev Tu-134
Aviation accidents and incidents in Ukraine
Malév Hungarian Airlines accidents and incidents
1971 in the Soviet Union
September 1971 events in Europe
1971 in Ukraine
1970s in Kyiv